This article lists events that occurred during 1937 in Estonia.

Incumbents
Prime Minister – Konstantin Päts

Events
29 July – a new constitution in force with civil liberties and democracy restored but with a very strong presidency.

Births
8 April – Maila Rästas, actress (d. 2008)
4 September – Mikk Mikiver, actor and theatre director (d. 2006)
13 September – Meeli Sööt, actress
21 September – Aarne Üksküla, actor and theatre instructor (d. 2017)

Deaths
11 June – Hando Mugasto, Estonian graphic designer

References

 
1930s in Estonia
Estonia
Estonia
Years of the 20th century in Estonia